Lena Kaur (born 1986) is a London-based British actress, perhaps best known for her role as Leila Roy in Channel 4 soap Hollyoaks.

Career

Lena Kaur grew up in Almondbury in Huddersfield, West Yorkshire and is of Asian descent. She attended Almondbury High School and then New College which helped her achieve her dream of being an actress. She studied acting at Rose Bruford College, Sidcup, Kent, graduating in 2007.

Later that year she was part of the original cast of BBC Three comedy sketch show Scallywagga, in which she played multiple characters. After successfully being cast as Leila Roy, she joined the cast of Hollyoaks in summer 2008. In August 2008, Lena Kaur praised Hollyoaks producer Bryan Kirkwood for not stereotyping Asians on the programme. Speaking to Take 5 magazine, she stated, "The storylines for me and Stephen (Ravi) aren't being dictated by the colour of our skin. We're both British Asians in real life as well as in the show. We are both totally westernised. We've been brought up in Britain, so the storylines will reflect people like Stephen and me." Kaur announced her decision to leave to pursue new challenges in late 2009, and made her last appearance as Leila in January 2010.

In 2011 she appeared as Alicia Patel in Torchwood's fourth series; Torchwood: Miracle Day airing on BBC One and US premium television network Starz.

In November 2016 she appeared in Stratford upon Avon at the Swan Theatre with the Royal Shakespeare Company in the Rover. (https://www.rsc.org.uk/the-rover/production-photos)

Selected filmography

References

External links 
Leila Roy on the *Hollyoaks website

Alumni of Rose Bruford College
British actresses of South Asian descent
Actresses from Yorkshire
Actresses from Huddersfield
English Sikhs
1986 births
English television actresses
English voice actresses
English soap opera actresses
English film actresses
Living people